Gammarus baysali is a cave-dwelling species of freshwater amphipod crustacean, found in Turkey. The species belongs to the broader Gammarus pulex group and was scientifically described in 2013 from Cumayanı Cave, Zonguldak Province.

The most discriminant characters of this species are the minute eyes, densely setose fifth peduncle and flagellar segments of antenna 2, elongated pereiopods, and setose anterior margins of pereiopods 5 to 7. Additionally, the palp of right maxilla 1 has 4 setae along its outer margin.

References

baysali
Cave crustaceans
Freshwater crustaceans of Asia
Endemic fauna of Turkey
Crustaceans described in 2013